Montgomery Ward Warehouse may refer to:

Montgomery Ward Warehouse (1908), Chicago, Illinois, one of the buildings of the Montgomery Ward Company Complex, designed by Hugh M.G. Garden and Richard E. Schmidt
Henkel-Duke Mercantile Company Warehouse (1895), Pueblo, Colorado, also known as "Montgomery Ward Warehouse"
Montgomery Plaza, a current mixed-use development in Fort Worth, Texas, which served as a Montgomery Ward warehouse from 1928 to 2001

See also
Montgomery Ward Building (disambiguation)

Montgomery Ward